Atala Riffo and Daughters v. Chile (Spanish: Atala Riffo y Niñas vs. Chile) was an LGBT rights child custody case in the Inter-American Court of Human Rights, which reviewed a Chilean court ruling that in 2005 awarded custody to a father because of the mother's sexual orientation.  In 2012, the IACHR ruled in favor of the mother. It was the first case the Inter-American Court took regarding LGBT rights. The Court's ruling also determined sexual orientation to be a suspect classification.

Child custody
Karen Atala Riffo is a Chilean judge and lesbian mother of three daughters. Atala was separated from her husband in 2001, and originally reached a settlement with her ex-husband that she would retain custody of the children. When Atala came out as a lesbian in 2002, however, the ex-husband sued for custody, where the case was eventually heard by the Supreme Court of Chile.  That court awarded the husband custody, saying that Atala's relationship put the development of her children at risk.

IACHR appeal
In late 2004, Atala took the case to the Inter-American Commission on Human Rights, supported by amicus briefs from a number of rights organizations including the National Center for Lesbian Rights.  In 2008, the Commission ruled that the case was admissible to the Court, as it concerned Article 24 of the American Convention on Human Rights concerning equal protection. This marked the first time the IACHR had taken an LGBT rights case.

In 2010, the Court ruled that sexual orientation was a suspect class, and that in Atala had been discriminated against in the custody case in ways incompatible with the American Convention. In 2012, the court further awarded custody and damages of USD $50,000 damages and $12,000 in court costs. Chile's Minister of Justice, Teodoro Ribera said that Chile would abide by the ruling.

As precedent
In December 2012, Mexico's highest judicial body, the Supreme Court of Justice of the Nation, unanimously struck down an Oaxaca law which prohibited same-sex marriage, with a decision based in part in the Atala ruling's prohibition of "any rule, act, or discriminatory practice based on sexual orientation".

References

Further reading

External links
 Inter-American Commission on Human Rights Decision, March 2010
 Inter-American Court of Human Rights Ruling, February 2012

LGBT rights case law
2012 in case law
LGBT rights in Chile
Legal history of Chile
Trials regarding custody of children
Inter-American Court of Human Rights cases
2012 in LGBT history